Two ships of the Royal Navy have borne the name HMS Southdown:

  was a  minesweeper launched in 1917 and sold in 1926. 
  was a  launched in 1940 and scrapped in 1956.

Royal Navy ship names